Capitán José Daniel Vazquez Airport , also known as Puerto San Julián Airport or San Julián Airport, is an airport serving Puerto San Julián, a town on San Julian Bay in the Santa Cruz Province of Argentina.

There is a steep ravine on the south side of the west end of the runway. Runway 07 has an unusual narrow extension prior to the marked threshold, with a turnaround at the end.

The San Julian VOR-DME (Ident: SJU) is located on the field.

Airlines and destinations
No scheduled flights operate at this airport.

See also

Transport in Argentina
List of airports in Argentina

References

External links
OpenStreetMap - San Julian

Airports in Santa Cruz Province, Argentina